Kanchanpur is a village in Asoha block of Unnao district, Uttar Pradesh, India. It is located on a major district road and has one primary school and no healthcare facilities. As of 2011, its population is 1,793, in 314 households.

The 1961 census recorded Kanchanpur as comprising 2 hamlets, with a total population of 917 (470 male and 447 female), in 165 households and 148 physical houses. The area of the village was given as 699 acres.

References

Villages in Unnao district